"Westford Knight" is the name given to a pattern, variously interpreted as a carving or a natural feature, or a combination of both, located on a glacial boulder (also known as the Sinclair Rock)  in Westford, Massachusetts in the United States.

It is the subject of popular or pseudohistorical speculation on Pre-Columbian trans-oceanic contact. The pattern was first described as a possible Native American carving in 1873. The identification as a "medieval knight" dates to 1954.

Early references
The rock and carving are first mentioned in print in an 1873 edition of the "Gazetteer of Massachusetts" and was described as "There upon its face a rude figure, supposed to have been cut by some Indian Artist."  In an 1883 town history, the carving is described as "A broad ledge which crops out near the house of William Kitteredge has upon its surface grooves made by glaciers. Rude outlines of the human face have been traced upon it, and the figure is said to be the work of Indians." The carving was subsequently interpreted not as a human figure but as a broken Norse Sword by William Goodwin in his book on the America's Stonehenge site.

Frank Glynn, president of the Archaeological Society of Connecticut, re-located the carving and following discussions with T. C. Lethbridge about Goodwin's theory, chalked in a full figure in 1954, resembling a medieval knight, with a sword and shield, and he is usually said to be the "discoverer of the Westford Knight." It was Lethbridge who suggested to Glynn that the sword was not of Viking origin, but was "a hand-and-a-half wheel pommel sword" common in 14th century North Britain.

Contemporary interpretations

Archaeologist Ken Feder has compared weathering on the stone with weathering on New England gravestones whose inscriptions have become indecipherable in the last twenty years, while "the Westford petroglyph, rather miraculously, appears to have improved through time, getting fresher every year with new elements appearing that previously had gone unnoticed. In truth, this simply isn’t possible. The new imagery on the Westford Knight stone either has been recently added or is entirely imaginary, and probably a bit of both." He argues that the Indian petroglyph described in the 19th century probably existed as did the parallel glacial striations, and that later a metal row or awl was used to punch the partial shape of a sword into the rock, and that "The knight in all his regalia resides only in the imagination of Frank Glynn. Other images—for example, a boat, which I could not discern on my visits—may have been added later."

The current interpretation by those who advocate that the feature on the rock is a human figure is that it commemorates a fallen member of the party of Henry Sinclair, a Scottish Earl from Orkney, whom some believe to have made a voyage to the New World in 1398, traveling to Nova Scotia and New England. According to Raymond Ramsey in 1972, the shield carried by the knight in the image was found to support this belief, when "English heraldic experts consulted by Lethbridge definitely identified arms on the shield as belonging to the Sinclairs of Scotland". It has been suggested that the knight is Sir James Gunn, a member of Clan Gunn and a Knight Templar who reportedly traveled with Sinclair. The monument next to the "knight" commemorates this interpretation, stating as fact that Sinclair and his party traveled to present-day Massachusetts. 
The claim was mentioned in an Encyclopedia of Dubious Archaeology in 2010.

See also
 Priory of Sion
 Kensington Runestone
 The Skeleton in Armor
 Zeno map

Notes

Books

 Frederick J. Pohl, Prince Henry Sinclair: His Expedition to the New World in 1398, 1974, Clarkson N. Potter, New York: 
 Robert Ellis Cahill, New England's Ancient Mysteries, 1993, Old Saltbox, Danvers, Mass: 
 David Goudsward, Ancient Stone Sites of New England, 2006, McFarland Publishing: 
 David Goudsward, Westford Knight and Henry Sinclair, 2010, McFarland Publishing: 
 David S. Brody, Cabal of the Westford Knight : Templars at the Newport Tower : a novel, 2009, Martin and Lawrence Press, Groton, Mass: 

R. Celeste Ray (Editor) Transatlantic Scots, University of Alabama Press, 2005.

External links

 Westford Knight information by the Westford Museum
 Discounting of the knight from archaeological standpoint
 Rock in a hard place

Pre-Columbian trans-oceanic contact
Geography of Middlesex County, Massachusetts
Landmarks in Massachusetts
Tourist attractions in Middlesex County, Massachusetts
Westford, Massachusetts
Pseudoarchaeology
Geofacts